Étienne Goyémidé (22 January 1942 – 17 March 1997), was a Central African writer and playwright. He is notable as the writer of critically acclaim novels Le silence de la forêt and Dernier Survivant de la caravane.

Personal life
He was born on 22 January 1942 in Ippy, Central African Republic in a peasant family. From 1991 to 1992, he was Minister of Education and Research. In 1993, he received a grant from the National Book Center in France. He was later appointed Minister of Education and then Honorary Ambassador of UNESCO. He was also a part of the Troupe des Griots before heading the National Troupe of Central Africa.

Goyémidé died on 17 March 1997 at the age of 55.

Career
Goyémidé obtained a degree in educational sciences as well as an English diploma. Then he became a teacher headed the Normal School of Teachers in Bangui. He later worked in education department and was director of a printing house. He also became the director of the National Troupe of Central Africa.

In 1984, he wrote his famous novel Le silence de la forêt (The Silence of the Forest). The story focused on the story of a Central African civil servant who abandons everything to take a trip to the forest and meets Babinga pygmies. The novel was later adapted for cinema in 2003 by Didier Florent Ouénangaré and Bassek Ba Kobhio. The film received critical acclaim and was also part of the selection of the Directors' Fortnight at the 2003 Cannes Film Festival. In 2003, he received a special mention at the 2003 Festival International du Film Francophone de Namur (FIFF).

Then in 1985 he wrote the novel Dernier Survivant de la caravane (The Last Survivor of the Caravan). It focuses on the slavery of black Africans perpetrated by North African Muslims where Ngalandji recounts the drama of his village in Banda country. He was the winner of the RFI competition for the best short story in the French language in multiple times.

Theater work
 La petite leçon, 1976
 Le Monsieur de Paris, 1978
 Au pied du Kapokier, 1978
 Mes respects Monsieur le Directeur, 1978
 Le vertige, 1981
 Les mangeurs de poulets crevés, 1983
 Responsabilité collective, 1988
 Demain... la liberté

Author work
 Le silence de la forêt, 1984
 Dernier Survivant de la caravane, 1985
 In the Name of The Law, 1989

Filmography

References

External links

 Goyemide on slavery: the liberating power of the word
 Goyémidé, Etienne Overview
 Étienne Goyémidé (1942–1997)

1942 births
1997 deaths
Central African Republic writers
Central African Republic people
African writers